The 2016 RBC Tennis Championships of Dallas was a professional tennis tournament played on hard courts. It was the 19th edition of the tournament which was part of the 2016 ATP Challenger Tour. It took place in Dallas, United States between 1 and 6 February 2016.

Singles main-draw entrants

Seeds

 1 Rankings are as of January 18, 2016.

Other entrants
The following players received wildcards into the singles main draw:
  Jean Andersen 
  Sekou Bangoura
  Ernesto Escobedo
  Alex Kuznetsov

The following players received entry into the singles main draw as alternates:
  Mitchell Krueger 
  Marek Michalička

The following player received entry into the singles main draw as a lucky loser:
  Nicolás Barrientos

The following players received entry from the qualifying draw:
  Marinko Matosevic 
  Eric Quigley 
  Clay Thompson 
  Mikhail Vaks

Champions

Singles

 Kyle Edmund def.  Daniel Evans, 6–3, 6–2

Doubles

 Nicolas Meister /  Eric Quigley def.  Sekou Bangoura /  Dean O'Brien, 6–1, 6–1

External links
Official Website

RBC Tennis Championships of Dallas
Challenger of Dallas
RBC Tennis Championships of Dallas
RBC Tennis Championships of Dallas
RBC Tennis Championships of Dallas